is the protagonist of Murasaki Shikibu's important Heian-era Japanese novel The Tale of Genji. The story describes him as a superbly handsome man and a genius. Genji is the second son of a Japanese emperor, but he is relegated to civilian life for political reasons and lives as an imperial officer.

The first part of the story concentrates on his romantic life, and in the second, his and others' internal agony is depicted. He appears from the first volume "Kiritsubo" to the 40th volume "Illusion".

"Genji" is the surname as a noble demoted from royalty. His true given name is never referred to in the story, like most other characters. "Hikaru" means "shining", which is a nickname deriving from his appearance. He is often called Genji when speaking of the story.

It's implied that Hikaru Genji was extremely attractive and talented, easily gaining the favor of those around him at a young age. Describing his superlative qualities, Murasaki wrote: "but to recount all his virtues would, I fear, give rise to a suspicion that I distort the truth." His appearance was said to tempted men and women alike, having desirable features such as smooth white skin, accredited fashion, and famed popularity.

The character of Hikaru Genji has had several adaptations in other media, from different iterations of The Tale of Genji. He is usually universally depicted as possessing unrivaled beauty and charisma in all subsequent media adaptations.

While fictitious, Genji is thought the author was inspired by real historical figures, including Minamoto no Tōru, who was a grandson of Emperor Saga, hence one of the Saga Genji clan.

Life of Hikaru Genji in Tale of Genji

It is common to divide the tale into three parts, and this article follows that custom, but the division is not made explicit in the original version of the story written by Lady Murasaki.

Part one 
Hikaru Genji was born the second son of Emperor Kiritsubo (桐壺帝) by his lower ranked consort, . Genji was blessed with peerless beauty and genius, even from infancy, and was nicknamed "the Shining Prince". His mother died when he was only three years old. Pursuit of the feminine ideal represented by his deceased mother is an important element that drives many of his subsequent romantic pursuits.

His father Emperor Kiritsubo considered appointing Hikaru the crown prince. He was however worried that his second son had no support from his maternal line. After being further discouraged by a prediction by a fortuneteller that the country would be thrown into chaos if Hikaru would ascend to the throne, the Emperor lowered Hikaru's rank to civilian, giving him the clan name Minamoto (Genji).

Utsusemi, the wife of the Iyo Deputy and stepmother of the Governor of Kii, is memorable as the first woman Genji courts in the tale and also, arguably, as the first to resist him. Frustrated because he cannot reach Utsusemi, Genji beds little Kogimi, Utsusemi's younger brother, for Genji "found the boy more attractive than his chilly sister," as a replacement for her. This episode constitutes the only open reference to homosexuality in the tale.

Genji adored his stepmother , a later favorite consort of Emperor Kiritsubo, because of her close resemblance to the dead Lady Kiritsubo, and that similarity was also the reason that Emperor Kiritsubo had her enter his court. As a result of Fujitsubo and Genji's forbidden love, she bore a boy, later , to Genji when he is 19, but almost no one knew the truth of his birth, and the child was raised as a prince and son of Emperor Kiritsubo.

He had two wives in the legal sense during his life; he married Lady Aoi (Aoi no Ue､葵の上) in his youth, and much later 
(meaning "The Third Princess", called so in Japanese, and known as Nyōsan in the Arthur Waley translation.) Lady Aoi died after she bore a son to Genji. But Genji's de facto wife and most beloved one was Lady Murasaki, a niece of Fujitsubo. Genji met her by chance when she was very young - at the age of 10, and when he was 18 years old. When her grandmother who brought her up died, and before her real father could take her to his mansion, Genji kidnapped Murasaki and brought her up himself. After Aoi died, Genji made her his unofficial wife. Although their marriage didn't follow the whole protocol of official marriage, she received as many honours as the factual wife of Genji. But she officially remained his concubine, and that was one of the reasons Genji was offered the opportunity to marry the Third Princess in the second part of the story. Genji couldn't reject this offer because of his affection for Fujitsubo, but Onna san no miya was so young that she turned out to be too naïve, and he was very disappointed and had many regrets.

Genji had many love affairs. He even made love to one of his brother's de facto consorts . She was nominally the Head of Ladies-in-waiting and no official consort, but it was a scandal, and gave a pretext to political opponents. Genji moved to Suma, in Harima Province, before he could be expelled officially.

In Harima province, Genji met Lady Akashi and had a daughter by her. Later his brother Emperor Suzaku was afflicted by illness and feared it was a result of the wrath of his late father's spirit, by his poor treatment of his brother, Genji. Genji was invited to return to Miyako (nowadays Kyoto). He left Lady Akashi and the child, and returned to Kyoto.

After Genji was back in Kyoto, Emperor Suzaku abdicated in favor of the crown prince (Reizei) who was really the son of Genji and Fujitsubo. This prince ascended to the throne, but he learned the secret of his birth by chance, and wanted to abdicate in favor of his real father, Genji. It was however impossible and as the second best, Emperor Reizei later gave Genji nearly the same rank as an abdicated emperor. After rising to this noblest rank, Genji was called , a name taken from his mansion.

Genji wanted his daughter to be the next Empress. He invited Lady Akashi and the child (known as Princess Akashi, 明石の姫君) to Kyoto. Later, Lady Murasaki adopted this girl and raised her. This girl later became a consort of the crown prince and eventually his empress.

Part two 
At the age of forty, he married his niece Onna san no Miya, who was a daughter of his elder half-brother , and her mother was a lady whose half-sister was Empress Fujitsubo, hence another niece. This marriage did not make him happy. , a friend of his son , hence a nephew of Lady Aoi, lusted after Onna san no Miya and sought her love even after her marriage with Genji. Finally he intruded into Rokujoin and raped her. She bore a boy whose father was Kashiwagi. Genji later discovered the secret and became angry, but finally realized it was just what he had done to his father, and it was a punishment of his past treachery to his father and emperor. He decided to keep the secret of the birth of this boy and to bring him up as his real and third child.

References

Further reading

External links
 The Tale of Genji by Murasaki Shikibu

The Tale of Genji
Fictional bisexual males
Fictional LGBT characters in literature
Fictional Japanese people
Genji, Hikaru
Fictional princes
Fictional rapists